Spectacle Theater is a collectively run, independent movie theater that operates out of a small space in Williamsburg, Brooklyn in New York, United States.

History 
Spectacle Theater opened in September 2010 at 124 S. 3rd Street in Brooklyn in a space that used to be a bodega. From its beginning, the theater was dedicated to showing rare, independent, or arthouse films (that cannot be found on DVD) at $5 per ticket.

In 2013, Spectacle was awarded the "Best Weird Repertory Film Programming" by The Village Voice.

After a rent increase and lease-mandated improvements in 2015, the theater ran a Kickstarter campaign to keep operating out of the same space in central Williamsburg. The campaign was successful and the theater stayed open at its location at 124 S. 3rd Street.

As of 2017, the theater also runs a weekly radio show at Newtown Radio, where volunteers discuss music and film.

Venue 
Spectacle Theater is a 35-seat microcinema. The Theater is run by volunteers and screenings are BYOB. Spectacle volunteers print their own posters for each screening, which are displayed outside the theater. The outside of the theater is unadorned, aside from the posters, and painted black.

Programming 
Spectacle screens films seven days a week, often including midnight screenings and biweekly matinees, including "Blood Brunch" for horror films and "Fist Church" for kung fu films. Programs are selected by volunteers, who prepare promotional materials like pamphlets and posters, as well as run the projector during shows. Spectacle has hosted the first-ever U.S. retrospectives of filmmakers such as Roland Klick, Rogério Sganzerla, Dore O., Andrew Horn, Tadeusz Konwicki, Katrina del Mar, Sarah Minter, Sidney Sokhona, Alyce Wittenstein, and many others. Volunteers also cut and edit their own trailers for screenings and series presented at the theater. These trailers often mimic and mock the iconography of the MPAA film rating system. Screenings sometimes have different formats like "VHS nights", talks, live-score shows, and Q&As with directors.

References

External links 
 

Repertory cinemas
Theatres in Brooklyn
2009 establishments in New York City